Arthur Larard (30 December 1870 – 15 August 1936), also known by the nickname of "Alf", was a South African international rugby union and rugby league footballer. He primarily played as a half back, but also played many games at  during his rugby league career.

Rugby union career
In 1888, aged 17, Larard moved to South Africa, where he played rugby union throughout the 1890s. In 1896, he was selected to play for South Africa against the touring British Lions. He débuted in the second Test on 22 August 1896 in Johannesburg, and were defeated by the Lions 7–18. His second appearance came in the final game of the series on 5 September 1896 in Cape Town, with Larard scoring the only try in a 5–0 win for South Africa – the country's first ever victory in international rugby.

Rugby league career
In 1901, Larard returned to England. He went on to play four seasons in the Northern Union with Huddersfield, appearing 99 times and scoring 14 tries. He was also capped twice by Yorkshire.

References

1870 births
1936 deaths
English rugby league players
English rugby union players
Huddersfield Giants players
Rugby league centres
Rugby league halfbacks
Rugby league players from Kingston upon Hull
Rugby union halfbacks
Rugby union players from Kingston upon Hull
South Africa international rugby union players
Yorkshire rugby league team players